Venezuela competed at the 2017 World Games held in Wrocław, Poland.

Bowling 

Ildemaro Ruíz won the silver medal in the men's singles event.

Massimiliano Fridegotto and Ildemaro Ruíz won the silver medal in the men's doubles event.

Karate 

Antonio Díaz won the bronze medal in the men's kata event.

Powerlifting 

Yenifer Canelón won the bronze medal in the women's heavyweight event.

Road speed skating 

Jhoan Guzmán won the bronze medal in the men's 500 metre sprint.

Track speed skating 

Jhoan Guzmán won the silver medal in the men's 500 metre sprint.

References 

Nations at the 2017 World Games
2017 in Venezuelan sport
2017